Irene Amanda Burton is a Northern Irish actress. Her notable credits include Heather Haversham in the Channel 4 soap opera Brookside (1982–1986), Beth Glover in the ITV drama series Peak Practice (1993–1995), Sam Ryan in the BBC crime drama series Silent Witness (1996–2004, 2022), Clare Blake in the ITV crime drama series The Commander (2003–2008), Karen Fisher in the BBC school-based drama series Waterloo Road (2010–2011) and Katherine Maguire in the ITV detective series Marcella (2020).

Early life and education
Burton was born in Derry, Northern Ireland, the youngest of four sisters. Her father, Arthur Burton, was a primary school headmaster at Ballougry Primary School, which she attended as a child. She was raised at Ballougry, a rural townland on the south-western outskirts of Derry City, where her family lived in a house beside Ballougry Primary School, right beside County Londonderry's boundary with County Donegal. After later attending Londonderry High School, she moved to England at the age of 18, where she spent three years studying drama at the Manchester Metropolitan School of Theatre.

Career
Although best known for her television roles, Burton had worked almost exclusively in the theatre prior to landing the role of Heather Haversham in Channel 4's Liverpool-based flagship drama series Brookside. After nearly four years in the role, during which time Heather had become one of the show's most popular residents of Brookside Close, she began to lose sympathy with her character and decided to leave. Following her departure her television work consisted mainly of guest appearances, with parts in a number of peak-time drama series including Minder, Inspector Morse, Boon, Medics, Van Der Valk, Stay Lucky and Lovejoy.

In 1993, Burton starred alongside Kevin Whately in Peak Practice. She played the role of Doctor Beth Glover in the medical drama series, based in Derbyshire's Peak District, for three series until her departure in 1995. In 1996 she then took the main role of Professor Sam Ryan in the highly acclaimed BBC drama Silent Witness; she held this role until 2004. Though her decision to portray Ryan as a reflective personality – sometimes staring into space – was satirised by the comedienne Dawn French, she helped lay the groundwork for what was to become one of the most popular BBC series, continuing to run, albeit without her, until her return in 2021.

After Silent Witness, she took on the title role of Prosecutor Helen West in a series based on Frances Fyfield's novels. She also played Aunt Polly in a 2003 remake of Pollyanna and Commander Clare Blake in Lynda La Plante's drama, The Commander.

In 2010, Burton appeared in the sixth series of BBC drama Waterloo Road as new head teacher Karen Fisher, and departed the show in 2011. She took part in BBC1's Celebrity Masterchef and made it through to the semi-finals. She appeared as gangster's wife Cherie Le Saux in ITV drama The Level in Autumn 2016. In 2020, she had a starring role as crime family matriarch Katherine Maguire in the third season of Marcella.

Personal life
In 1976 Burton married theatre technician Jonathan Hartley, whom she met while at Manchester School of Theatre. They divorced in 1982. She married professional photographer Sven Arnstein in 1989, and the couple had two daughters, Phoebe Marie (born 1989) and Brid Irina (born 1991), before divorcing in 2004. Burton currently lives in Hastings, East Sussex.

Charity
Burton is an ambassador for The Children's Trust, the UK's leading charity for children with brain injury and neurodisability.

Filmography

Film

Television

Presenter

Awards and nominations

References and notes

External links

Living people
Television actresses from Northern Ireland
English soap opera actresses
Alumni of Manchester Metropolitan University
People educated at Foyle College
Actors from Derry (city)
20th-century actresses from Northern Ireland
21st-century actresses from Northern Ireland
Year of birth missing (living people)